Harisan (also Romanized as Harīsān; also known as Harsān) is a village in Qareh Chay Rural District, in the Central District of Saveh County, Markazi Province, Iran. At the 2006 census, its population was 686, in 168 families.

References 

Populated places in Saveh County